Daniele Crespi (159819 July 1630) was an Italian painter and draughtsman. He is regarded as one of the most original artists working in Milan in the 1620s.  He broke away from the exaggerated manner of Lombard Mannerism in favour of an early Baroque style, distinguished by clarity of form and content. A prolific history painter, he was also known for his portraits.

Life
He was born in a family that was originally  from Busto Arsizio.  It is not clear whether he himself was born in Busto Arsizio or in Milan. The date of his birth is not known with certainty with estimates ranging from 1591 to 1598.  His training is not well documented and he is first recorded in 1619 as working with local painter Guglielmo Caccia working on an assignment in a church in Milan.

One of his first teachers was Giuseppe Vermiglio of Turin. He next studied with Giovanni Battista Crespi and Giulio Cesare Procaccini.  In 1621, Crespi was involved with the Accademia Ambrosiana.

Crespi died in Milan during the plague epidemic in 1630.

Among his pupils was Melchiorre Giraldini.

Work
Crespi was mainly active as painter of religious subjects used as decoration for churches. He was also known for his sensitive portraits.
He was an excellent colorist, known for the simplistic beauty of his compositions. His best works include a series of pictures from the life of Saint Bruno (now in the Certosa di Garegnano in Milan) and a depiction of the Stoning of St. Stephen (in Brera).

Another masterpiece is the dark 1628 Supper of St Carlo Borromeo in the church of Santa Maria della Passione in Milan, one of the best-known early 17th-century paintings in northern Italy. Other works by him can be found in Milan and Pavia (Pavia Cathedral and Certosa di Pavia).

The Conversion of Saint Paul, painted about 1623, is considered to be the artist's finest painting in the United States (at the Blanton Museum of Art in Austin). When compared to Caravaggio's earlier work in the Cerasi Chapel, it shows the persistence of Crespi's Mannerist traits.

Notes

External links

1590 births
1630 deaths
People from Busto Arsizio
16th-century Italian painters
Italian male painters
17th-century Italian painters
Painters from Milan
Italian Baroque painters
17th-century deaths from plague (disease)
Italian Mannerist painters